Myshkin (masculine) or Myshkina (feminine) may refer to:
Myshkin Urban Settlement, a municipal formation which the town of district significance of Myshkin in Myshkinsky District of Yaroslavl Oblast, Russia is incorporated as
Myshkin (town), a town in Myshkinsky District of Yaroslavl Oblast, Russia
Myshkin (surname) (Myshkina), list of real and fictional people with this family name
Myshkin (singer), American singer-songwriter
Myshkin (album), 2008 album by Michou
Mysskin (born 1971), Indian film director, screenwriter, and actor, who chose his name after Prince Myshkin